The 2020 Washington State Senate elections took place as part of the biennial 2020 United States elections. Washington voters elected state senators in 26 of the 49 state legislative districts. Elections to the Washington State Senate were held on November 3, 2020.

Following the previous election in 2018, Democrats held a 28-seat majority in the Senate, compared to Republicans' 21 seats. Senators who did not run for re-election were Randi Becker, Maureen Walsh, and Hans Zeiger (all Republicans).

Democrats retained control of the Washington State Senate following the 2020 general election, with the balance of power remaining unchanged: 28 (D) to 21 (R).

Predictions

Summary of Results by State Senate District
Districts not listed were not up for election in 2020.

Source:

Detailed Results
Each party flipped a seat and the composition stayed at 28 D–21 R. Senators Dean Takko (D) and Steve O'Ban (R) lost reelection.

Note: Washington uses a top two primary system. Official primary results can be obtained here and official general election results here.

District 1

District 2

District 3

District 4

District 5

District 9

District 10

District 11

District 12

District 14

District 16

District 17

District 18

District 19

District 20

District 22

District 23

District 24

District 25

District 27

District 28

District 38

District 39

District 40

District 41

District 49

See also
2020 Washington elections
2020 Washington House of Representatives election
2020 Washington gubernatorial election
2020 Washington lieutenant gubernatorial election
2020 United States presidential election in Washington (state)
2020 United States House of Representatives elections in Washington

References

External links
 
 
  (State affiliate of the U.S. League of Women Voters)
 

Washington State Senate elections
state senate
Washington Senate